Maudlands railway station (also known as Maudland railway station, or Preston Maudland(s)) was the original Preston terminus of the Preston and Wyre Joint Railway to , in Lancashire, England. It was located on Leighton Street. The line and the station opened on 15 July 1840. The line crossed the Lancaster and Preston Junction Railway (L&PJR) on the level, immediately to the west of the station.

By 1844, most of the line's trains were diverted along the L&PJR's line to use the main Preston Station instead. However, Maudlands Station continued to be used for excursions and as a goods station for several decades before its eventual closure and demolition, by 1885, to make way for an extension of the Longridge Branch Line. The remainder of the site was then used for a replacement goods station on the Longridge line which connected from the east.

The site is now occupied by Leighton Hall on Leighton Street and by the University of Central Lancashire’s Roeburn Hall, with the disused Longridge line running between them.

Temporary station 
For two days in 1991, the station name "Preston Maudlands" was revived for a temporary platform. It was located on the Blackpool Line adjacent to Tulketh Brow, used as a temporary terminus on 9–10 March 1991 to allow bridge maintenance.

References 

Disused railway stations in Preston
Former Preston and Wyre Joint Railway stations
Railway stations in Great Britain opened in 1840
Railway stations in Great Britain closed in 1844
1840 establishments in England
1844 disestablishments in England